Gertrude Stein is an outdoor bronze sculpture of Gertrude Stein, located at Bryant Park in Manhattan, New York. The casting was installed in 1992 and is based on a model created by Jo Davidson in Paris in 1923. It neighbors the New York Public Library Main Branch, which, according to the New York City Department of Parks and Recreation, commemorates Stein's "significant literary contributions".

See also

 1992 in art

References

External links
 
 Story 1: Picturing Gertrude, National Portrait Gallery
 Ten Highlights: Smithsonian American Art Museum, National Portrait Gallery: Third Floor (PDF)
 From the Archives: Gertrude Stein will Watch Over you While you Shop, Bryant Park Corporation

1992 establishments in New York City
Bronze sculptures in Manhattan
Bryant Park
Cultural depictions of Gertrude Stein
Monuments and memorials in Manhattan
Monuments and memorials to women
Outdoor sculptures in Manhattan
Sculptures of women in New York City
Statues in New York City
Stein, Gertrude